Carlos Sáez (born 17 December 1917) was a Uruguayan sailor. He competed in the Swallow event at the 1948 Summer Olympics.

References

External links
 

1917 births
Possibly living people
Uruguayan male sailors (sport)
Olympic sailors of Uruguay
Sailors at the 1948 Summer Olympics – Swallow
Sportspeople from Montevideo